Pablo Andújar was the defending champion but chose not to defend his title.

Carlos Alcaraz won the title after defeating Pedro Martínez 7–6(8–6), 6–3 in the final.

Seeds

Draw

Finals

Top half

Bottom half

References

External links
Main draw
Qualifying draw

JC Ferrero Challenger Open - Singles